Gennady Grigoryevich Gridin (born 19 March 1961) is a Russian professional association football coach and a former player. He is the assistant manager with FC Mordovia Saransk.

External links
 

1961 births
Sportspeople from Stavropol
Living people
Soviet footballers
Russian footballers
Russian football managers
FC Dynamo Stavropol managers
FC Sodovik Sterlitamak managers
FC Khimki managers
Association football defenders
FC Dynamo Stavropol players